The National Police Commission (NAPOLCOM) is an agency attached to the Department of the Interior and Local Government (DILG) responsible for the administration and control of the Philippine National Police (PNP). It has the authority to administer police entrance examination, to investigate police anomalies and irregularities, and to summarily dismiss erring police officers.

History
The NAPOLCOM traces its roots from the creation of the Police Commission (POLCOM) under Republic Act 4864 (Police Act of 1966). It was reorganized as the National Police Commission (NAPOLCOM) in 1972.

The NAPOLCOM was under the Office of the President before being transferred to the Ministry of National Defense in 1975 by virtue of Presidential Decree 765 (Police Integration Law). In 1980, the agency was returned to the Office of the President by Executive Order No. 1040.

In 1990, with the establishment of the Philippine National Police (PNP), the present NAPOLCOM was created within the newly reorganized Department of the Interior and Local Government (DILG) under Republic Act No. 6975. The agency's authority was further strengthened and expanded by Republic Act No. 8551, otherwise known as 'Philippine National Police Reform and Reorganization Act of 1998'. Republic Act 8551 also amended Republic Act 6975, carving NAPOLCOM out of the DILG organization and making it simply an attached agency. The attachment of NAPOLCOM to DILG preserves it independence as the sole administrator and controller of the national police force under Article XVI, Section 6 of the 1987 Philippine Constitution.

Organization 
The NAPOLCOM as a collegial body is composed of an ex-officio chairperson, four regular Commissioners, and the PNP Chief as ex-officio member, one of whom is designated by the President as the vice-chairperson. The DILG Secretary is the ex-officio chairperson, while the vice-chairperson is the executive officer of the Commission.

The ex-officio Chairperson and four Commissioners constitute the Commission Proper which serves as the governing body thereof.

The staff services of the Commission are as follows: 

Planning and Research Service (PRS) provides technical services to the Commission in areas of overall policy formulation, strategic and operational planning, management systems or procedures, evaluation and monitoring of the Commission’s programs, projects and internal operations; and conducts thorough research and analysis on social and economic condition affecting peace and order in the country.
Legal Affairs Service (LAS) provides the Commission with efficient and effective service as legal counsel of the Commission; draft or studies contracts affecting the Commission and submit appropriate recommendations pertaining thereto; and render legal opinions arising from the administration and operation of the Philippine National Police and the Commission.
Crime Prevention and Coordination Service (CPCS) undertakes criminological researches and studies; formulates a national crime prevention plan; develop a crime prevention and information program; and provide editorial direction for all criminology research and crime prevention publications. Personnel and Administrative Service (PAS) performs personnel functions for the Commission; administers the entrance and promotional examinations for policemen, provides the necessary services relating to records, correspondence, supplies, property and equipment, security and general services, and the maintenance and utilization of facilities; provides services relating to manpower, career planning and development, personnel transactions and employee welfare.
Personnel and Administrative Service (PAS) performs personnel functions for the Commission; administers the entrance and promotional examinations for policemen, provides the necessary services relating to records, correspondence, supplies, property and equipment, security and general services, and the maintenance and utilization of facilities; provides services relating to manpower, career planning and development, personnel transactions and employee welfare.
Inspection, Monitoring and Investigation Service (IMIS) conducts continuous inspection and management audit of personnel, facilities and operations at all levels of command of the PNP; monitors the implementation of the Commission's programs and projects relative to law enforcement; and monitors and investigates police anomalies and irregularities. This is the Law enforcement Unit of the Commission.
Installations and Logistics Service (ILS) reviews the Commission’s plans and programs and formulates policies and procedures regarding acquisition, inventory, control, distribution, maintenance and disposal of supplies and oversees the implementation of programs on transportation facilities and installations and the procurement and maintenance of supplies and equipment.
Financial Service (FS) provides the Commission with staff advice and assistance on budgetary and financial matters, including the overseeing of the processing and disbursement of funds pertaining to the scholarship program and surviving children of deceased and/or permanently incapacitated PNP personnel.

The ex-officio chairperson and four commissioners constitute the Commission Proper which serves as the governing body of NAPOLCOM. The incumbent chairperson is DILG Secretary Benjamin Abalos, Jr.

The NAPOLCOM also has disciplinary appellate boards and various staff services as well as 17 regional offices which are strategically located in the different regional divisions of the country.

References

External links 

 

Philippine National Police
Department of the Interior and Local Government (Philippines)
National law enforcement agencies of the Philippines